Adrián Cortés Valdovino (born November 19, 1983) is a former Mexican professional footballer, who last played as a defender for Puebla F.C. on loan from Guadalajara in the Liga MX.

Cruz Azul
He made his debut April 6, 2003, against Deportivo Toluca, a game which resulted in a 3–1 victory for Cruz Azul. Adrián Cortés was on Cruz Azul's bench for 4 years, only being able to participate in 23 games (9 games as starter, 5 of them being in the Primera División Apertura 2003) in his entire stay at Cruz Azul. Primera División Apertura 2003 was his most active season in Cruz Azul, but unfortunately, the Mexican defender could not find a permanent spot in the team that had brought him up.

Coronel Bolognesi
Juan Reynoso, former Cruz Azul player, took Adrian Cortes to his Peruvian team, Coronel Bolognesi. Adrian Cortes did not let the opportunity slip, which even gave him the possibility to play in Copa Libertadores, the most prestigious CONMEBOL club-based tournament. His visit to Peru lasted only a semester, Adrian Cortes played for Tecos UAG in 2008. He then played for Cruz Azul Hidalgo in 2009.

References

External links

 
 https://web.archive.org/web/20080709054339/http://www.mediotiempo.com/noticia.php?id_noticia=60004

1983 births
Living people
Footballers from Mexico City
Association football defenders
Mexico under-20 international footballers
Cruz Azul footballers
Coronel Bolognesi footballers
Tecos F.C. footballers
C.D. Guadalajara footballers
C.D. Veracruz footballers
Club Puebla players
Cafetaleros de Chiapas footballers
Liga MX players
Mexican expatriate footballers
Expatriate footballers in Peru
Mexican expatriate sportspeople in Peru
Mexican footballers